The Bay Parkway station (formerly known as 22nd Avenue station) is a local station on the BMT Sea Beach Line of the New York City Subway, located in Bensonhurst, Brooklyn at the intersection of Bay Parkway and West Seventh Street. It is served by the N train at all times. During rush hours, several W and northbound Q trains also serve the station.

History

This station opened on June 22, 1915, along with the rest of the Sea Beach Line.

, all three tracks have been replaced with a new track bed and new track panels. From January 18, 2016, to May 22, 2017, the Manhattan-bound platform at this station was closed for renovations and a temporary wooden platform was placed over the Coney Island-bound express track for the Manhattan-bound service. The Coney Island-bound platform was closed for a much longer period of time, from July 31, 2017 to July 1, 2019. During this time, all southbound trains used the northbound express track and the temporary platform, with short-turn W trains terminating here instead of their normal terminus at Gravesend–86th Street.

Station layout

This open-cut station has four tracks and two side platforms. The two center express tracks are not normally used. The Coney Island-bound track has been disconnected from the line and the Manhattan-bound track is signaled for trains in both directions. Both platforms are carved into the earth with the concrete walls painted beige. Beige (previously blue-green) columns, a few of which being I-beams, run along both platforms for the entire length with every other one having the standard black station name plate with white lettering.

Exits
This station has two entrances/exits at either extreme ends, both of which are station houses on the overpass above the tracks. The full-time one is at the west (railroad north) end. It has a single staircase from platform, a crossover, and waiting area. Outside the turnstiles, there is a token booth before doors lead out to Bay Parkway and 66th Street. The station house is made of tile and stucco and built within other businesses.

The other station house at the south end is made of patchwork and is un-staffed, containing just HEET turnstiles and exit-only turnstiles. Inside fare control, there is a waiting area, crossover, and one staircase to each platform.

Notes

References

External links 

 
 Station Reporter — N Train
 The Subway Nut — Bay Parkway Pictures 
 Bay Parkway entrance from Google Maps Street View
 Avenue O entrance from Google Maps Street View

BMT Sea Beach Line stations
New York City Subway stations in Brooklyn
Railway stations in the United States opened in 1915
1915 establishments in New York City
Bensonhurst, Brooklyn